Don Matías is a municipality in Antioquia Department, Colombia. Part of the subregion of Northern Antioquia. Bordered to the north by the municipality of Santa Rosa de Osos, to the east by the municipalities of Santa Rosa de Osos and Santo Domingo, to the south by the municipality of Barbosa, and to the west by the municipality of San Pedro de los Milagros.

History

Since 1624 the Don Matías territory was occupied by settlers from the city of Santa Fe de Antioquia. In 1750 the places San Andrés, Las Ánimas, Las Juntas, La Chorrera began to be populated, and today it forms the urban population.

This occupation was the result of new government policies by the crown of Borbón, which the visitor Mon y Velarde applied in Antioquia, seeking the establishment of agricultural colonies in the north of the province. Those who occupied the present territory of Don Matías were basically mazamorreros, independent miners, who were awarded the title of their plots.

The municipality has had three names: Azuero, San Antonio Infante and Don Matías. The latter, Don Matías was chosen in 1787 in honor of Don Matías Jaramillo, a man who had a rich mining settlement in the territory where the population now lives. The garment industry in the town was established in the 60s, thanks to the decentralization of manufacturing industries in the city of Medellín. In this way came to the township of Don Matías the industrial clothing company, which almost exclusively produced for a company called Caribou. Thus, the community found a source of employment, as the municipality for those years was basically agrarian.

A decade later garment factories began to emerge where those industrial garment company workers, having learned the trade, decided to start their own small industries. Today Don Matías has extensive national and international recognition. One of its main attractions is the Riogrande Dam.

Demographics

Total Population: 19,458 hab. (2009)
 Urban Population: 12,663
 Rural Population: 6,795
Literacy rate: 91.3% (2005) 
 Urban area: 94.3%
 Rural area: 85.8%
According to figures from the Government of Antioquia based on Quality of Life survey 2004 the prevailing socio-economic strata in the municipality of Don Matías is 2 (low) which includes 70.9% of all homes. It is followed by stratum 3 (medium-low) with a 23.3%. Then there is the stratum 1 (low-high) with 4.4% of homes. Finally there is the 4 (medium) including 1.4% of homes.

Ethnography

According to figures presented by the DANE census 2005, the ethnographic composition of the township are
 Whites & Mestizos (99.7%)
 Afro-Colombians (0.2%)
 Indigenous (0.1%)

Economy 

 Livestock: Dairy Cattle, Pigs
 Industry: Apparel
 Timber
Don Matías bases its economy mostly on the textile and apparel industry, pigs and dairy cattle, and the timber industry.

References

External links
 http://parroquiadonmatias.org

Municipalities of Antioquia Department